"Bloodfeather" is a song by American rock band Highly Suspect. The song was released as the second single from the band's debut studio album Mister Asylum in November 2015.

"Bloodfeather" peaked at #5 on the Billboard Mainstream Rock chart on February 27, 2016 and a spent a total of 20 weeks on the chart.

Music video
The song's music video was conceptualized and directed by TS Pfeffer. The video premiered on March 16, 2016 through Interview Magazine.

Charts

Personnel
Johnny Stevens – vocals, guitar
Rich Meyer – bass
Ryan Meyer – drums

References

External links
Official Music Video on YouTube

2015 songs
2015 singles
Highly Suspect songs
300 Entertainment singles